Bassoles-Aulers is a commune in the department of Aisne in the Hauts-de-France region of northern France.

Geography
Bassoles-Aulers is located some 18 km southeast of Chauny and 15 km east by southeast of Laon. Access to the commune is by road D532 which runs off the D5 in a loop through the commune and the village then back to the D5 near Quincy-Basse. The D13 road also forms part of the northern border of the commune and links to two country roads leading to the commune and the village. The commune is heavily forested in the north, east, and south with areas of farmland in the centre and west of the village. There are three hamlets in the commune apart from the village: Le Fau, Les Berceaux, and Marimont.

The Ru de Basse rises south of the village and flows south to join the Canal of Oise and Aisne.

Neighbouring communes and villages

History
The church was rebuilt after the First World War by André Perrin.

Administration

List of Successive Mayors of Bassoles-Aulers

Population

Sites and monuments

The Church contains two items that are registered as historical objects:
A Baptismal font (12th century)
A Bronze Bell (1630)

Notable People linked to the commune
André Perrin (1881-1969): Chevalier (1915) then Officer (1936) of the National Order of the Legion of Honour. Officer of the Academy. Croix de Guerre, Croix des Services Militaires Volontaires, and Chevalier in the Ordre du Mérite militaire (National Order of Military Merit) (1961). Architect who built the school and rebuilt the church after the War of 1914-1918.

See also
Communes of the Aisne department

References

External links
Bassoles-Aulers on the old IGN website 
40000 Bell Towers website 
Bassoles-Aulers on Géoportail, National Geographic Institute (IGN) website 
Aulers Bassole on the 1750 Cassini Map

Communes of Aisne